Love Nest on Wheels is a 1937 Educational Pictures short subject directed by Buster Keaton and Charles Lamont.  The film borrows heavily from Keaton's 1918 film The Bell Boy.

The film is notable because it is one of the rare times that Buster Keaton appeared onscreen with his family, whom he had performed with in vaudeville.

Plot
Elmer and his family run a hotel which is on the verge of closure unless they pay their mortgage by the end of the day. A newly married couple arrive at the hotel and are quickly unimpressed by the dilapidated state it is in. Elmer convinces them to buy a trailer belonging to him, reasoning that they will be able to spend their honeymoon traveling the country instead of at the hotel. The couple agree to buy the trailer but Elmer discovers that his Uncle Jed has been using the trailer to house a cow which is now too big to get out. Representatives from the bank arrive to shut down the hotel but the family manages to free the cow from the trailer and successfully sell it to the couple in time to pay off their mortgage.

Cast
Buster Keaton ... 	Elmer
Myra Keaton 	... 	Elmer's Ma
Al St. John 	... 	Uncle Jed
Lynton Brent ... 	The Bridegroom
Diana Lewis 	... 	The Bride
Bud Jamison 	... 	The Mortgage Holder
Louise Keaton ... 	Elmer's Sis
Harry Keaton ... 	Elmer's Brother

External links 
 
 Love Nest on Wheels at the International Buster Keaton Society

1937 films
1937 comedy films
Films directed by Buster Keaton
American black-and-white films
Films directed by Charles Lamont
Educational Pictures short films
American comedy short films
1930s American films